Putuo District, is a municipal district of Shanghai Municipality, People's Republic of China. Putuo District borders Baoshan District to the north, Jing'an District to the east and south east, Changning District to the south west and Jiading District to the west.

Overview
The name of Putuo District comes from Putuo Road, located within the district. Suzhou Creek crosses the Putuo District and makes up the eastern boundary of the area, shared by Jing'an District. The Shanghai Putuo District People's Government is located on Daduhe Road.

The Zhenru Temple, Jade Buddha Temple, and Changfeng Park are located in the district. The Shanghai West Railway Station is in Putuo District. East China Normal University has a Putuo campus.

Administrative divisions

Putuo District has eight subdistricts and two townships. Below is a list of subdistricts and towns in Putuo District.

Economy
O.C.T. Mami, a Chinese maternity wear brand, has its headquarters in the district.

Lianhua Supermarket has its Shanghai office in the district.

Population
In 2009, the region's total registered population was 872,600. The natural growth rate of households was -1.99‰. At the end of 2009, there was a resident population of 1,135,900. The Putuo district is home to populations representing 44 minorities, the largest of whom are Chinese Muslims from the country's northwest. They account for a total minority population of 70%.

Education 
In 2014, 100% of children residing in Putuo District are enrolled in compulsory education, and 97.88% are enrolled in high schools.

There are 25 mainstream primary schools, with 34,143 students enrolled, 47 mainstream high schools with 27,542 students enrolled, 77 nurseries and kindergartens with 27,382 student enrolled, 1 vocational school with 1529 students enrolled, 2 special education schools with 429 students enrolled and 1 work-study school with 13 students enrolled.

Primary schools

Public 
 Shanghai Putuo District Changzheng Central Primary School
 Shanghai Putuo District New Putuo Primary School
 Shanghai Putuo District Caoyang Experimental Primary School
 Shanghai Putuo District Zhenruwenying Central Primary School
 Shanghai Putuo District Yangjia Bridge Primary School
 Shanghai Putuo District Zhenru Primary School No. 3
 Shanghai Putuo District Zhenguang Primary School
 Shanghai Putuo District Lianjian Primary School
 Shanghai Putuo District Shude Primary School
 Shanghai Putuo District Hengde Primary School
 Shanghai Putuo District Taopu Central Primary School
 Shanghai Putuo District Hui People Primary School
 Shanghai Putuo District Wuning Road Primary School
 Shanghai Putuo District Lujiazhai Primary School
 Shanghai Putuo District North Zhongshan Road Primary School No. 1
 Shanghai Putuo District Xunyang Road Primary School
 Shanghai Putuo District Guanlongxincun Primary School
 Shanghai Putuo District Pingli Road Primary School No. 1
 Shanghai Putuo District Hutaixincun Primary School No. 1
 Shanghai Putuo District Huayin Primary School
 Shanghai Putuo District Chaochun Central Primary School
 Shanghai Putuo District Caoyangxincun Primary School No. 6
 East China Normal University Primary School
 Shanghai Putuo District Jinshajiang Road Primary School

Private 
 Shanghai Jinzhou Primary School

Middle schools 
 Shanghai Wuning Middle School
 Shanghai Huayin Middle School
 Shanghai Beihai Middle School
 Shanghai Yanhe Middle School
 Shanghai Xinglong Middle School
 Shanghai Nujiang Middle School
 East China Normal University Affiliated High School No. 4
 Shanghai Normal University Affiliated Experimental School No. 2
 Shanghai Zhenbei High School 
 Shanghai Putuo District Education Department Affiliated High School
 Shanghai Xinyang High School
 Shanghai Meilong Middle School
 Shanghai Lantian High School
 Shanghai Yuhua High School
 Shanghai Luochuan School
 Shanghai Caoyang Affiliated Middle School No. 2
 Shanghai Jinyuan Affiliated Advanced High School
 Shanghai Yichuan Affiliated Middle School
 Shanghai Putuo District Affiliated Middle School
 Shanghai Caoyang Affiliated Middle School
 Shanghai Jiangning School
 Shanghai Guangxin School
 Shanghai Tongchuan School
 Shanghai Shatian School
 East China Normal University Affiliated Foreign Languages Experimental School
 Shanghai Zizhang Middle School
 Shanghai Zhongyuan Experimental School
 Shanghai Wanlicheng Experimental School
 Shanghai International Studies University Shangyang Foreign Languages School
 Shanghai Wenda School
 Shanghai New Huangpu Experimental School
 Shanghai Jinding School
 Shanghai Conservatory of Music Affiliated Anshun Experimental Middle School
 Shanghai Taopu School
 Shanghai Caoyang Middle School No. 9
 Shanghai Caoyang Middle School
 Tongji University Affiliated Middle School No. 2
 Shanghai Ganquan Foreign Languages Middle School
 Shanghai Changzheng Middle School
 Shanghai Jinhua Private Middle School
 Shanghai Peijia Bilingual School
 Shanghai Caoyang Middle School No. 2
 Shanghai Jinyuan Advanced School
 Shanghai Yichuan Middle School
 Shanghai Zhenru Middle School
 Shanghai Tongbai Advanced Middle School
 Shanghai Chengzheng Secondary School
 It was established in 1965.

Higher education 
 East China Normal University (North Zhongshan Road Campus)
 Tonji University (Huxi Campus)
 Shanghai University of Engineering Science (Xincun Road Campus)

Special education 
 Shanghai Putuo District Qixing School
 Shanghai Chengyuan Middle School
 Shanghai Putuo District Ganlin Primary Technology Vocational School

Transportation

Train

Shanghai Railway Bureau 
The Shanghai West Railway Station operated by the Shanghai Railway Bureau is located within Putuo District. The station serves the:  
 Shanghai-Nanjing Intercity High-Speed Railway, and the;  
 Beijing-Shanghai Railway.

Shanghai Metro 
Putuo District is currently served by seven metro lines operated by Shanghai Metro:
 and  - Jinshajiang Road , Caoyang Road  , Zhenping Road , Zhongtan Road
 - Xincun Road, Langao Road, Zhenping Road , Changshou Road 
 - Longde Road , Caoyang Road , Fengqiao Road, Zhenru , Shanghai West Railway Station , Liziyuan, Qilianshan Road, Wuwei Road, Taopu Xincun
 - South Qilianshan Road, Zhenbei Road, Daduhe Road , Jinshajiang Road , Longde Road , Wuning Road , Changshou Road , Jiangning Road.
 - Zhenguang Road, Tongchuan Road , Zhenru , Zhongning Road, Caoyang Road station  , Wuning Road 
 - Qi'an Road, Gulang Road, East Wuwei Road, Shanghai West Railway Station , Tongchuan Road , North Meiling Road, Daduhe Road , Changfeng Park

Bus 
There are 34 public diesel bus routes, 4 electric bus routes and 85 long-distance bus routes running through Putuo District.

Important Roadways 
 National Highways
  G204
  G312
 National Expressways
  G42 (Shanghai-Chengdu Expressway)
 Shanghai Expressways
  S5 (Shanghai-Jiading Expressway)
  S20(Shanghai Outer Ring Expressway)
 Ring Roads
 Middle Ring Road
 Inner Ring Road
 Main Roads
 North Zhongshan Road
 Langao Road
 Xincun Road
 Caoyang Road
 Wuning Road
 Jinshajiang Road
 Qilianshan Road
 South Qilianshan Road
 Meichuan Road
 Taopu Road
 Jiaotong Road
 Moganshan Road
 Ningxia Road
 Daduhe Road
 Zhenbei Road
 Cao'an Highway
 Zhennan Road
 Gulang Road

Public facilities

Parks 
 Changfeng Park
 Suzhou River Mengqingyuan Environmental Park
 Weilai Island Park
 Xianghe Park
 Lanxi Youth Park
 Yichuan Park
 Changshou Park
 Guanlong Park
 Putuo Park
 Caoyang Park
 Zhenguang Park
 Meichuan Park
 Hutai Park
 Haitang Park
 Ganquan Park
 Zhenru Park

Post offices 
In March 2012, the Shanghai Post Putuo District Postal Bureau was established. Due to regulations set out by the Chinese government, in March 2014, the bureau was renamed to Shanghai Post Putuo District Branch. 
 Putuo Post Office Sub-Branch
 Yejiazhai Post Office
 Changhua Road Post Office
 Hutai Post Office Sub-Branch
 Yichuan Post Office
 Ganquan Post Office
 Caoyangxincun Post Office Sub-Branch
 East China Normal University Post Office
 Changfengyicun Post Office
 Shiquan Post Office Sub-Branch
 Wuning Road Post Office Sub-Branch
 Zhenping Post Office
 Taopu Post Office Sub-Branch
 Tiedao University Post Office
 West Wuwei Road Post Office
 Hongmian Road Post Office
 Zhengru Post Office Sub-Branch
 Beishi Road Post Office
 Zhenguang Post Office
 Wanli Post Office

References

Further reading

External links

 
Districts of Shanghai